Vachellia sphaerocephala, the bull's horn thorn or bee wattle, is a plant species in the family Fabaceae. The name comes from the shape of the thorns which do indeed resemble the horns of a bull. The tree has a strong, symbiotic relationship with a species of stinging ant, Pseudomyrmex ferruginea. This tree is endemic to Mexico.

References

sphaerocephala